Perran Kutman (born Perran Kanat on 30 November 1949) is a Turkish actress who usually appears in comedic roles.

She went to the Istanbul Municipal Conservatory and started her professional acting career in 1967 at the Ulvi Uraz Theatre. She participated in several plays such as with Nisa Serezli in 1969, Sezer Sezin in 1973, Miyatro in 1980 until her final play Artiz Mektebi  in 1987.

Kutman became interested in the film industry or 'Yeşilçam' as it was widely known at the time, and made her film debut in 1971 opposite Müjdat Gezen in Kaynanam Tatilde. She then appeared in a number of successful films, including Köyden İndim Şehire, Salak Milyoner, Hababam Sınıfı and Gırgıriye.

She starred in the comedy series Perihan Abla (Sister Perihan), one of the most watched shows in the history of Turkish television. Kutman had major successes in other series like Kızlar Yurdu, Şehnaz Tango, Bir Kadın Bir Erkek, Üzgünüm Leyla and Hayat Bilgisi

She was married to actor Hüseyin Kutman whose surname she took. After they divorced, she married the musician Koral Sarıtaş.

References

External links
 

1949 births
Living people
Actresses from Istanbul
Turkish comedians
Turkish film actresses
Turkish television actresses
Turkish stage actresses
Golden Orange Life Achievement Award winners
20th-century Turkish actresses